Daniel A. Wagner is the UNESCO Chair in Learning and Literacy, and professor of education at the University of Pennsylvania, where his research specializes in learning, literacy, child development, educational technologies, and international educational development. He is founding director (1983) of Penn’s Literacy Research Center and the federally funded National Center on Adult Literacy (1990). In recent years, the center has become the International Literacy Institute (ILI), co-established by UNESCO and the University of Pennsylvania. Wagner is also the director of Penn’s International Educational Development Program (IEDP) and is a Fellow of the American Psychological Association, the American Anthropological Association, and the American Educational Research Association. He is the author numerous books and articles on learning, literacy, cross-cultural research and methodologies, and is a frequent speaker at major national and international conferences across the world. He has worked as an advisor to, among others, the World Bank, UNESCO, UNICEF, USAID, and DFID. In 2012,  Wagner was appointed by Hillary Clinton as a Member of the U.S. National Commission for UNESCO. In the same year, he was named UNESCO Chair in Learning and Literacy. In 2012-2014, he served as Chair of the Brookings Global Research Task Force on Learning. In 2014, he was a recipient of the UNESCO Confucius International Literacy Prize. He has maintained multi-year educational projects in India, South Africa, and Morocco.

Early life and education

Born in 1946 and raised in Chicago, Illinois, Wagner’s grandfather was an electrical engineer who helped to build the first electricity grid and street lighting in the city of Chicago in the 1920s. Following in his grandfather's and father's footsteps, Daniel Wagner completed his undergraduate degree in Engineering from Cornell University in 1968. In graduate school he shifted to psychology, completing a master's degree in experimental psychology from the University of Michigan in 1971, and a PhD in developmental psychology in 1976. Later, he was a NIH postdoctoral fellow in human development at the Harvard University Graduate School of Education between 1979and 1981. He has been a visiting fellow at the International Institute of Educational Planning in Paris, a visiting professor at the University of Geneva (Switzerland), and a Fulbright Scholar at the University of Paris-René Descartes. He served as a Peace Corps volunteer in Morocco for two years 1968-70 working as a civil engineer in rural areas of the Middle Atlas Mountains.

Career
Wagner has served as an advisor to a wide range of agencies, including: United Nations, UNESCO, UNICEF, Ford Foundation, IDRC, World Bank, USAID, UK-DFID, OECD, Van Leer Foundation, International Institute for Educational Planning, International Bureau of Education, Fast Track Initiative/Global Partnership for Education, U.S. Department of Education, National Science Foundation, U.S. Food and Drug Administration, National Academy of Sciences, and numerous NGO and university-funded projects.
As Director of the International Educational Development Program (IEDP) at the University of Pennsylvania, Wagner oversees an annual cohort of approximately 20-30 Masters and Doctoral students. Since 2009, the IEDP has graduated more than 100 students, who work in a number of international organizations, such as: UNESCO, UNICEF, OECD, World Bank, Save the Children, and Aga Khan Foundation. The program has a close relationship with UNESCO and the Peace Corps, and is responsible for the PennIEDP-Peace Corps Coverdell Fellowships and the UNESCO Fellowship.

Research
Wagner research focuses on learning, literacy, child development, educational technologies, and international educational development. This work focuses on understanding how learning takes place in children, youth and adults in a variety of settings. His work is diverse in terms of subsectors of education, including both early grade reading and adult literacy, bilingualism and cognitive development, improving learning assessments in developing countries, and the UN Sustainable Development Goals.

Selected publications
Wagner, D. A. (2018). Learning as development: Rethinking international education in a changing world. NY: Routledge.

Wagner, D. A., Castillo, N. M., & Grant Lewis, S. (2022). Learning, Marginalization, and Improving the Quality of Education in Low-income Countries. London: Open Book Publishers.

Wagner, D. A. (2020). Learning as development: Rethinking international education in a changing world. Tokyo: Horitsu-Bunka-Sha  (in Japanese translation), by permission of Taylor-Francis.Wagner, D. A., Wolf, S. & Boruch, R. F. (eds.) (2018). 

Learning at the bottom of the pyramid: Science, measurement, and policy in low-income countries. Paris: UNESCO-IIEP. http://www.iiep.unesco.org/en/learning-bottom-pyramid-4608

Wagner, D. A. (2019). Apprentissage et Developpement: Repenser l’éducation internationale dans un monde qui change. Paris: Editions Harmattan.

Wagner, D. A. (Ed.). (2014). Learning and Education In Developing Countries: Research and Policy for the Post-2015 UN Development Goals. NY: Palgrave Macmillan.

https://www.amazon.com/Learning-Education-Developing-Countries-Development-ebook/dp/B00MGOB930/ref=tmm_kin_title_0?_encoding=UTF8&sr=&qid=
Wagner, D. A. (2014). Mobiles for Reading: A Landscape Research Review. Technical Report. Washington, DC: USAID. 
https://web.archive.org/web/20160307023227/http://www.meducationalliance.org/sites/default/files/usaid_wagner_report_finalforweb_14jun25_1.pdf
Wagner, D. A., Murphy, K. M. & de Korne, H. (2012). Learning first: A research agenda for improving learning in low-income countries. Center for Universal Education Working Paper. Washington, D.C.: Brookings Institution. https://web.archive.org/web/20160304091151/http://www.brookings.edu/~/media/research/files/papers/2012/12/learning%20first%20wagner%20murphy%20de%20korne/12%20learning%20first%20wagner%20murphy%20de%20korne.pdf
Wagner, D. A. (2011). What happened to literacy? Historical and conceptual perspectives on literacy in UNESCO. International Journal of Educational Development. 31, 319–323.
Wagner, D. A. (2011). Smaller, Quicker, Cheaper: Improving Learning Assessments in Developing Countries. Paris/Washington: UNESCO-IIEP/FTI-Global Partnership for Education. (in English and French) http://unesdoc.unesco.org/images/0021/002136/213663e.pdf
Wagner, D. A. (2010). Quality of education, comparability, and assessment choice in developing countries. COMPARE: A Journal of Comparative and International Education 40(6): 741-760.
Wagner, D. A. (2008).  Global perspectives on the science of literacy and education. Handbook of Cross-Cultural Developmental Science. M. Bornstein (eds.). NJ: Erlbaum.
Wagner, D. A. (2008). Alphabetisation et le lettrisme aujourd’hui. Dictionnaire de l’education. A. van Zanten (eds.). Paris: Presses Universitaires de France.
Wagner, D. A., & Sweet, R. (Eds.) (2006). ICT and Learning: Supporting Out-of-School Youth and Adults. Paris: OECD/NCAL, 2006.
Wagner, D. A. & Kozma, R. (2010). New technologies for literacy and adult education: A global perspective. Paris: UNESCO. (In English, French and Arabic).
Wagner, D. A. (Ed.) (2005). Monitoring and Evaluation of ICT in Education Projects: A Handbook for Developing Countries. Washington, D.C.: World Bank/InfoDev. http://www.infodev.org/infodev-files/resource/InfodevDocuments_9.pdf
Wagner, D. A., Venezky, R. L., & Street, B. V. (Eds.). (1999). Literacy: An International Handbook. Boulder, CO: Westview Press.
Wagner, D. A. (1990), Literacy: Developing the future (in 5 languages)

Personal life
Wagner lives in Philadelphia with his wife (a lecturer and psychologist) and two children.

References

External links
University of Pennsylvania: http://www.upenn.edu
International Literacy Institute: www.literacy.org
International Educational Development Program: www.gse.upenn.edu/iedp
MOOCs4D conference: www.moocs4d.org
UNESCO Chair: http://www.unesco.org/en/university-twinning-and-networking/access-by-region/europe-and-north-america/united-states-of-america/unesco-chair-in-learning-and-literacy-929/

1946 births
University of Pennsylvania faculty
Cornell University alumni
University of Michigan alumni
Living people